Marc Gasparoni (born 15 July 1959) is a French sprinter. He competed in the men's 100 metres at the 1984 Summer Olympics.

References

1959 births
Living people
Athletes (track and field) at the 1984 Summer Olympics
French male sprinters
Olympic athletes of France
Mediterranean Games silver medalists for France
Athletes (track and field) at the 1983 Mediterranean Games
Athletes from Paris
Mediterranean Games medalists in athletics